Vang may refer to:

People
Vang is a common surname among Hmong Americans, including
Vang Pao (1929–2011), Lieutenant General in the Royal Lao Army and a leader of the Hmong American community in the United States
Ka Vang (born 1975), writer
Chai Vang (born 1968), convicted murderer
Bee Vang (born 1991), actor, best known as Thao Vang Lor in Gran Torino
Katie Ka Vang, artist, playwright
Bora Vang (born 1987), Chinese-born Turkish table tennis player

Places
Vang, Bornholm, a village on the island of Bornholm, Denmark
Vang, Innlandet, a municipality in Innlandet county, Norway
Vang i Valdres, a village in the municipality of Vang in Innlandet county, Norway
Vang, Hedmark, a former municipality in the old Hedmark county, Norway
Vang, a village in Ka Choun, Cambodia
Vəng (disambiguation), a list of similarly-named places in Azerbaijan

Other
Vang (spritsail), a sailing part
Boom vang, a sailing part
Gaff vang, a sailing part
D-alanine—D-serine ligase, an enzyme